Zhou Gengsheng (1889–1971) was a Chinese jurist, historian and academic.

Biography
Born in Changsha County, Hunan, the son of a school principal, Zhou studied political economy at Waseda University in Japan (where he joined the Tongmenghui), obtained a master's degree in political economy from the University of Edinburgh in Scotland, and a doctorate in international law from the University of Paris in France.

Zhou served as professor of political science at Peking University, and professor of diplomatic history and public international law at Wuhan University. From 1945 to 1949, he was president of Wuhan University.

After the founding of the People's Republic of China in 1949, he served as vice chairman of the Central-South Military and Political Committee (which was responsible for political and military affairs in Guangdong, Hainan, Henan, Hubei and Hunan), special adviser to the Ministry of Foreign Affairs, deputy director of the Chinese People's Institute of Foreign Affairs and director of the Committee of International Treaties of the Ministry of Foreign Affairs. 

A personal friend of Zhou Enlai, he was accepted as a member of the Communist Party of China in 1956.

References

1889 births
1971 deaths
Chinese jurists
University of Paris alumni
Alumni of the University of Edinburgh
Waseda University alumni
Academic staff of Sun Yat-sen University
Academic staff of the National Central University
Academic staff of Wuhan University
Academic staff of Peking University
Presidents of Wuhan University
Members of Academia Sinica
Commercial Press people
Delegates to the 1st National People's Congress
Delegates to the 2nd National People's Congress
Delegates to the 3rd National People's Congress